Adams Station is an unincorporated community in Del Norte County, California. It is located on the Smith River just west of Gasquet, at an elevation of 338 feet (103 m).

The place is named for Mary Adams Peacock, who established Adams Station in 1898. Mrs. Peacock was a stagecoach driver and proprietress of a tavern here during the stagecoach days.

References

External links

Unincorporated communities in California
Unincorporated communities in Del Norte County, California